Hans Christoph Karl Friedrich Naumilkat (9 December 1919 – 13 February 1994) was a German composer and music educator.

Life
Born in Schönebeck, Naumilkat passed his Abitur in 1938 and subsequently studied music and music education in Braunschweig, Berlin and Halle.

After the Second World War, Naumilkat headed the folk music department, the music department of children's radio and the children's choirs of the Berliner Rundfunk, which were founded in 1950. He worked as a freelance composer and from 1957 as a music teacher.

Naumilkat composed mainly vocal works for his choirs, for school practice and for the GDR pioneer organisation; the lyrics of many of his songs were written by his wife Ilse, who also worked as a choir director. Through inclusion in school books, radio broadcasts, television productions with the choirs he conducted and live performances up to the act of state, his songs achieved wide distribution.

Naumlkat died in Berlin at the age of 74.

Compositions 
 Cantatas
 Die Brücke
 Deutschland, du liebe Heimat
 Vom Trümmerstein zum Bauprogramm, 1952
 Wir wollen aufrecht gehen durch dieses Leben, 1958
 Über unserer Heimat scheint die Sonne, 1959
 Jeder neue Morgen bringt uns ein neues Glück, 1966
 Junge Saat unterm Bohrturm, 1978
 Weihnachtslied
 Vorfreude, schönste Freude (text: Erika Engel-Wojahn)
 Kinder- und Pionierlieder
 Fröhlich sein und singen
 Unsere Heimat
 Wir haben Ferien und gute Laune
 Soldaten sind vorbeimarschiert
 Das Fernsehturmlied
 Bummi-Lied (Kam ein kleiner Teddybär)

References

External links 
 
 

German composers
1919 births
1994 deaths
People from Schönebeck